Benjamin Atwood Smith II (March 26, 1916 – September 26, 1991) was an American politician who served as a member of the United States Senate from December 1960 until November 1962.

Early life and education
Smith, who was named for his grandfather Benjamin A. Smith, was born in Gloucester, Massachusetts, to R. Russell Smith and Grace Smith. He married Barbara M. (née Mechem) of Lake Forest, Illinois, and Annisquam, Massachusetts. They had five children, sons R. Russell Smith II and Benjamin A. Smith III, an ice hockey player and coach, and daughters Barbara (Smith) Ramsey, Susan (Smith) Crotty, and Cathleen Smith.

Smith attended the Gloucester public schools. Smith was captain of the 1933 Gloucester High School football team. He later graduated from Governor Dummer Academy and Harvard University. While at Harvard, Smith played fullback on the football team under coach Dick Harlow. At Harvard, Smith was a roommate of John F. Kennedy.

Military service 
Smith served in the United States Navy for four years during World War II. While he was in the Navy, Smith served in the Pacific as Commander on an anti-submarine, anti-torpedo vessel.

Career
Smith served as a member of the Gloucester School Committee, the Gloucester City Council and was a trustee of the Addison Gilbert Hospital. Smith served as Mayor of Gloucester from 1954 to 1955; however, at the time Smith was mayor, Gloucester was adhered to a Plan E form of government. The office of mayor was a ceremonial position, the mayor was a city councilor chosen by the city council. The city administration was carried out by a professional city manager.

For many years Smith was the chief executive of his family's business, the Merchants Box Company in Gloucester.

Senate appointment 
After being elected President of the United States, John F. Kennedy resigned his seat in the United States Senate on December 22, 1960. Kennedy, who had been reelected to a second Senate term of six years in 1958, advised then-Governor Foster Furcolo to appoint Smith to fill the vacated seat "in the interest of promoting party unity." Critics said Smith, a close friend of the Kennedy family, was intended to be a "seat-warmer" until the President-elect's brother Ted Kennedy turned thirty (the minimum age provided by the U.S. Constitution for eligibility to serve in the Senate). Indeed, Smith served as Senator until November 6, 1962, when Edward Kennedy won the special election.

Special ambassador 
In 1963, President Kennedy named Smith as the chairman of the U.S. delegation to the North Pacific Fisheries Conference involving the United States, the Soviet Union, Canada and Japan.

Death and burial
Smith died after a long illness in the Addison Gilbert Hospital in Gloucester, Massachusetts, and was buried in the Calvary Cemetery in Gloucester.

References

External links

 Retrieved on 2008-01-23

1916 births
1991 deaths
20th-century American politicians
20th-century American businesspeople
American business executives
Businesspeople from Massachusetts
Democratic Party United States senators from Massachusetts
Harvard University alumni
Massachusetts city council members
Massachusetts Democrats
Mayors of Gloucester, Massachusetts
Military personnel from Massachusetts
The Governor's Academy alumni
United States Navy officers
United States Navy personnel of World War II